Flers is a commune in the Orne department in Normandy, France.

The inhabitants are called Flériens.

Geography

Flers is bordered to the north by the communes of Saint-Georges-des-Groseillers and Aubusson, to the north-east by Ronfeugerai, to the west by La Lande-Patry and Saint-Paul, to the south-west by La Chapelle-Biche, La Chapelle-au-Moine and Messei, and to the south-east by La Selle-la-Forge.

The commune is situated in the north-west of the Orne département, about ten kilometres from the border of the Calvados, an hour east of Granville, and two hours by train from Paris.  It depends on a prefecture located an hour north in Caen.

The commune is crossed by the river Vère which ends in the river Noireau in Pont-Erembourg (commune of Saint-Denis-de-Méré).

Climate
Flers is part of the region that stretches from the Bocage to the Écouves forest, the wettest part of the Orne département, with relatively mild temperatures thanks to its proximity to the English Channel and the effect of the sea. It benefits from an oceanic climate with mild winters and temperate summers.

History
The first written mentions of Flers appear at the end of the twelfth century as Flers (1164–1179) or Flex (1188–1221). Some authors think that the name of the town derives from the German toponym Hlaeri, meaning wasteland or common grazing land, while others suggest an origin in the German Fliessen, from the Dutch vliet or the Latin fluere Latin Fluere, indicating a waterflow, basin or marsh. Yet another etymology links Flers to the Latin flexus, meaning the bend in a road or river. Finally, the Breton term fler or flear means bad smell, indicating the stench of stagnant water. All etymologies seem to agree however that the town is named for its topography and the water close to it.

Middle Ages
From the tenth century on, the de Flers family headed a barony. Tradition has it that in the 11th century, the two brothers Foulques d'Aunou and Guillaume de Gasprée married two sisters who were Ladies of Flers. Foulques d'Aunou received as his wedding gift Flers, seat of the barony.

The construction of the castle of Flers began in the 12th century as a fortified location of wood and stone surrounded by water. The chronicles of the Hundred Years War do not mention a fortified place in Flers, revealing that it didn't present a major strategic interest at the time.

Construction of the castle
In 1790, in the revolutionary period, Flers formed a canton in the district of Domfront, in the Orne département. The countess of Flers, Jacqueline Le Goué de Richemont, wife of Pierre-François de Paule de La Motte-Ango, supported the counter-revolutionary chouans. The castle of Flers became the headquarters of count Louis de Frotté, one of the leaders of the Normandic Chouannerie.

Industrial Revolution
In 1901, Julien Salles, mayor of Flers, bought the castle for the community.

World War II
Like other towns near the D-Day landing, Flers was one of the targets of strategic bombing of Normandy on 6 and 7 June 1944, aimed at reducing the advance of German reinforcements. 80% of the town was destroyed. What remained of the town was liberated on 16 August by the British 11th Armoured Division and the memorial to the division is at Pont de Vère, north of Flers.

Heraldry

Demographics

Transport

Flers station is served by TER Normandie trains between Paris and Granville. It has a local bus system for Flers and the surrounding communities, and departmental lines connecting it with other major towns in Orne and Calvados. Flers also has a small airstrip

Monuments and interesting places
The castle, dating back to the 16th and 18th century, houses a museum of ancient and 19th century paintings and sculptures, applied art (furniture and decoration) and local history. Other interesting visits are the early 20th century neo-gothic Saint-Germain church and the 19th century neo-Romanesque Saint-Jean church, and the covered market built in 1883 on a former cemetery.

Notable people

 Paulette Duhalde (1921–1945), heroine of the resistance, died when deported to Ravensbrück

Born in Flers
 Jean-Pierre Brard, politician
 Tony Chapron, international football (soccer) referee
 Gérard Larcher, President of the Senate of France
 Patrice Lecornu, professional football (soccer) player
 Alain Lemercier, racewalker
 Sébastien Lewis, chef
Guy Mollet, politician
 François Morel, comedian, writer and singer
 Thibault Moulin footballer who plays for Legia Warsaw.

Twin towns
 Warminster, United Kingdom, since 1973
 Poundou, Burkina Faso, since 1977
 Wunstorf, Germany, since 1994

See also
 Communes of the Orne department

References

External links

Official local sites
 Official site of the agglomeration
 Tourist Office
 Castle of Flers Museum 

Maps
 National geographic institute

Communes of Orne